The 2019 Copa Sevilla was a professional tennis tournament played on clay courts. It was the 22nd edition of the tournament which was part of the 2019 ATP Challenger Tour. It took place in Seville, Spain between 9 and 15 September 2019.

Singles main-draw entrants

Seeds

 1 Rankings are as of 26 August 2019.

Other entrants
The following players received wildcards into the singles main draw:
  Carlos Alcaraz
  Carlos Gómez-Herrera
  Pablo Llamas Ruiz
  Ricardo Ojeda Lara
  Tommy Robredo

The following players received entry into the singles main draw using protected rankings:
  Íñigo Cervantes
  Daniel Muñoz de la Nava

The following players received entry from the qualifying draw:
  Gerard Granollers
  David Vega Hernández

Champions

Singles

 Alejandro Davidovich Fokina def.  Jaume Munar 2–6, 6–2, 6–2.

Doubles

 Gerard Granollers /  Pedro Martínez def.  Kimmer Coppejans /  Sergio Martos Gornés 7–5, 6–4.

References

2019
2019 ATP Challenger Tour
2019 in Spanish tennis
September 2019 sports events in Spain